Culatello di Zibello is a cured meat with a Protected Designation of Origin (PDO) in the EU and UK (EC regulation n°1263/96) typical of the province of Parma. Listed among the Slow Food Presidia of Emilia-Romagna, Culatello, mentioned for the first time in a document dating back to 1735, is produced from the leg of pork, which is then stuffed into the pig's bladder.

Production 
The Consortium of Culatello di Zibello has established that the processing of Culatello di Zibello can only take place in a specific and circumscribed area and exclusively in the period between October and February, when the Bassa is enveloped in fog and cold. It is in that period that the part of meat obtained from the thigh of adult pigs, bred according to traditional methods, is dehided, degreased, boned, separated from the Fiocchetto and trimmed by hand, so as to give it its characteristic "pear" shape. The culatello and fiocchetto trimmings are then used in the preparation of strolghino.

These operations are followed, after about ten days, by salting and the so-called investiture, that is, the stuffing of the cured meat into the pig's bladder and the tying with string which, after aging, must have a large, irregular mesh. The aging in the cellar accompanies Culatello from the winter fog to the summer heat, to arrive on tables the following winter in the fullness of its most original flavor qualities.

The aging period is from a minimum of 10 months for the smaller pieces (at least 3 kg) up to an average of 14 months for all pieces. The annual production is about 50,000 pieces of Culatello di Zibello PDO.

Gallery

References

Related articles 

 Culatello con cotenna
 Prosciutto di Parma
 Coppa di Parma
 Salame di Felino
 Spalla di San Secondo
 Strolghino
 Fiocchetto (salume)
 Cucina parmigiana
 Cuisine of emilia

Sister projects 

  Wikizionario contiene il lemma di dizionario «culatello»
  Wikimedia Commons contiene immagini o altri file sul culatello
Salumi
Italian cuisine
Cuisine of Emilia-Romagna
Dried meat
Ham
Italian products with protected designation of origin